Falko is a given name. Notable people with the name include the following notable people:
Given name
Falko Bindrich (born 1990), German chess grandmaster
Falko Götz (born 1962), German former soccer player and last manager of Holstein Kiel
Falko Geiger, retired West German sprinter who specialized in the 400 metres
Falko Kirsten (born 1964), former German figure skater
Falko Krismayr, retired Austrian ski jumper
Falko Peschel (born 1965), German pedagogue and proponent of open learning
Falko Steinbach (born 1957), German pianist and composer
Falko Traber (born 1959), German high wire artist
Falko Weißpflog (born 1954), East German ski jumper who competed from 1977 to 1980
Falko Zandstra (born 1971), former Dutch speed skater

Surname
Grigory Falko (born 1987), Russian swimmer from St. Petersburg